Idrettsforeningen Ready is a sports club in Vestre Aker, Oslo, Norway. The club was established on June 14, 1907 by Aage Blom Lorentzen.

The football club play their home games at Gressbanen in Oslo. Gressbanen was the arena for the Norway national team before Ullevaal was constructed in 1928. Former Norwegian international Dan Eggen has played for Ready.

Ready's elite bandy team started playing in the Norwegian Bandy Premier League 2004–05, where they remain. The club has 14 Norwegian championships; the last one in 2015 after having won their 13th championship in 1927.

He was captain of the national bandy team and twice man of the year in Norwegian bandy, Christian Waaler, plays for the team. He is making an attempt to bring bandy to the Philippines. 

The club's female bandy team has five international players for Norway.

Ski jumper Jon Aaraas is a member of the club.

References

External links

Official site

Multi-sport clubs in Norway
Defunct athletics clubs in Norway
Football clubs in Oslo
Bandy clubs in Norway
Norwegian handball clubs
Sport in Oslo
Association football clubs established in 1907
Bandy clubs established in 1907
1907 establishments in Norway
Ski jumping clubs in Norway